Hock Mountain is a 7,750-foot-elevation (2,362 meter) summit located in the Methow Mountains, a subset of the North Cascades in Washington state. It is situated on the triple-shared boundary of North Cascades National Park, Lake Chelan-Sawtooth Wilderness, and Lake Chelan National Recreation Area, as well as the shared border between Chelan County and Okanogan County. Additionally, it lies one mile southwest of Twisp Mountain, and  due south of Stiletto Peak, the nearest higher neighbor. The north face is steep, granitic rock, but the west slope is more moderate, allowing a scramble ascent. Precipitation runoff from the north and west sides of Hock drains to the Stehekin River via Bridge Creek, whereas the south and east sides of the mountain drain into the South Fork Twisp River.

Climate
Most weather fronts originate in the Pacific Ocean, and travel east toward the Cascade Mountains. As fronts approach the North Cascades, they are forced upward by the peaks of the Cascade Range, causing them to drop their moisture in the form of rain or snowfall onto the Cascades. As a result, the west side of the North Cascades experiences high precipitation, especially during the winter months in the form of snowfall. During winter months, weather is usually cloudy, but, due to high pressure systems over the Pacific Ocean that intensify during summer months, there is often little or no cloud cover during the summer. Because of maritime influence, snow tends to be wet and heavy, resulting in avalanche danger.

Geology
The North Cascades features some of the most rugged topography in the Cascade Range with craggy peaks, ridges, and deep glacial valleys. Geological events occurring many years ago created the diverse topography and drastic elevation changes over the Cascade Range leading to the various climate differences. These climate differences lead to vegetation variety defining the ecoregions in this area.

The history of the formation of the Cascade Mountains dates back millions of years ago to the late Eocene Epoch. With the North American Plate overriding the Pacific Plate, episodes of volcanic igneous activity persisted. In addition, small fragments of the oceanic and continental lithosphere called terranes created the North Cascades about 50 million years ago.

During the Pleistocene period dating back over two million years ago, glaciation advancing and retreating repeatedly scoured the landscape leaving deposits of rock debris. The U-shaped cross section of the river valleys are a result of recent glaciation. Uplift and faulting in combination with glaciation have been the dominant processes which have created the tall peaks and deep valleys of the North Cascades.

Gallery

See also

Geography of the North Cascades

References

External links
 Weather: Hock Mountain
North Cascades National Park National Park Service

North Cascades
Mountains of Washington (state)
Mountains of Chelan County, Washington
Mountains of Okanogan County, Washington
North Cascades National Park
Cascade Range
North Cascades of Washington (state)
North American 2000 m summits